UWEC may refer to:

University of Wisconsin–Eau Claire
Union Water and Electricity Company, an owner of the Fujairah power and desalination plant